Hans-Jörg Krüger (born 26 January 1946) is a former German basketball player. He competed in the men's tournament at the 1972 Summer Olympics.

References

External links
 

1946 births
Living people
German men's basketball players
Olympic basketball players of West Germany
Basketball players at the 1972 Summer Olympics
People from Quedlinburg
Sportspeople from Saxony-Anhalt